The 1930 Rose Bowl was the 16th Rose Bowl game, an American post-season college football game that was played on New Year's Day 1930 in Pasadena, California. It featured the Pittsburgh Panthers against the USC Trojans.

Scoring

First Quarter
USC – Edelson, 55-yard pass from Saunders (Shaver kick good)
USC – Erny Pinckert, 25-yard pass from Saunders (Shaver kick blocked)

Second Quarter
USC – Duffield, 1-yard run (Baker kick failed)
USC – Duffield, 1-yard run (Baker kick good)

Third Quarter
USC – Russ Saunders, 16-yard run (Shaver kick good) 
Pitt – Walinchus, 28-yard pass from Baker (Parkinson kick good)
USC – Edelson, 39-yard pass from Saunders (Baker kick good)

Fourth Quarter
Pitt – Collins, 36-yard pass from Williams (Parkinson kick good)
USC – Wilcox, 57-yard pass from Duffield (Duffield dropkicked extra point)

Game notes
By losing to the Trojans, the Panthers gave up the most points since 1903.

References

Rose Bowl
Rose Bowl Game
Pittsburgh Panthers football bowl games
USC Trojans football bowl games
1930 in sports in California
January 1930 sports events